= Academic grading in Kosovo =

Measures of academic achievement in Kosovo

Kosovo has 13 grades

Universities are moving to bachelor's and master's degrees.

The academies use the normal grading system.

AL1: 90–100 AL2: 85–89 AL3: 80–84 AL4: 75–79 AL5: 65–74 AL6: 45–64 AL7: 20–44 AL8: 0–20
